Ryu Seong-ryong (November 1542 – May 1607), was a scholar-official of the Joseon Dynasty of Korea. He held many responsibilities including the Chief State Councillor position in 1592. He was a member of the "Eastern faction", and a follower of Yi Hwang.

Early life and education
Ryu was born in Hahoe Maeul, Andong, Gyeongsang province (today a UNESCO World Heritage Site), to a yangban family of the P'ungsan Ryu clan.

Ryu is said to have been so precocious that he absorbed the teachings of Confucius and Mencius at the age of 8. In 1564 the 19th year of Myeongjong, he passed the Samasi examination, and in 1566 he passed the Mun-gwa at a special examination, and then took the post of Gwonji bujeongja (권지부정사, 權知副正字). He held various other positions and in 1569 he joined the imperial birthday mission to Ming as a Seojanggwan (서장관, 書狀官, n°3 of the mission), returning to Korea the following year.

Career
Thereafter he held posts including Inspector of Classics (경연검토관, 經筵檢討官) and devoted himself to editing, being granted a royal sabbatical (사가독서, 賜暇讀書). Subsequently, he held posts including Gyori (교리, ranked 5a) and Eunggyo (응교, 應敎, ranked 4a). He was appointed Jikjehak (직제학, 直提學) in 1575 and Bujehak (부제학, 副提學) in 1576. Continually he held posts including Doseongji (都承旨), Daesaheon (대사헌, 大司憲) and Daejehak (대제학, 大提學).

In 1590, he was appointed Uuijeong (Third State Councillor), honored with the third rank of 
Gwanguk Gongsin (광국공신, 光國功臣), and appointed as Pungwon Buwongun (풍원부원군, 豊原府院君). In 1591, he was promoted to Jwauijeong (Second State Councillor) and Ijo Panseo (이조판서, Minister of Personnel, the first ranked of the six Ministries). However, the Easterners faction split into the Southerners and the Northerners. Ryu Seong-ryong was a Southerner (claiming exile, instead of death, for Jeong Cheol, the leader of the Westerners rival faction).
 
He was in the rank of provincial Dochechalsa (도체찰사, 都體察使) when the Imjin War broke out. In 1592 he was appointed Yeonguijeong, the Chief State Councillor. Ryu Seongryong accompanied the royal family from Hanseong to Uiju. In this capacity, he oversaw all military units and called leaders like Yi Sun-sin and Gwon Yul to battle. He also fought on the Korean-Chinese allied forces side in the Siege of Pyongyang. He suggested of establishment the Hunnyeon Dogam (훈련도감, 訓鍊都監, Training capital garrison).

In 1598, he was ousted by the Northerners faction. But King Seonjo rehabilitated him. However, he refused to take office as a minister in 1600. Nevertheless, in 1602, he was honored  with the second rank of Hoseong Gongsin (호성공신, 扈聖功臣), and appointed again as Pungwon Buwongun.

Later life and death
After which he spent his time on political writing until his death in 1607.

Legacy
Ryu's major writings are preserved in the Seoaejip (The Anthology of Seoae, 서애집, 西厓集), Jingbirok (The Book of Corrections, 징비록, 懲毖錄), and minor writings as Hwanghwajip (황화집, 皇華集), Jeongchungrok (정충록, 精忠錄). Ryu Seong-ryong was enshrined in the Byeongsan Seowon and Hogye Seowon in Andong, North Gyeongsang.

Popular culture
 Portrayed by Lee Jae-ryong in the 2004-2005 KBS1 TV series Immortal Admiral Yi Sun-sin.
 Portrayed by Kim Sang-joong in the 2015 KBS1 TV series The Jingbirok: A Memoir of Imjin War.

See also 

 Political factions in Joseon Dynasty
 Ryu Si-won, an actor and singer, Ryu Seong-ryeong's 14th-generation descendant
 Hideyoshi's invasions of Korea

References

1542 births
1607 deaths
16th-century Korean people
People of the Japanese invasions of Korea (1592–1598)
Ryu clan of Pungsan
16th-century Korean philosophers
People from Andong